Tilton is a village in Danville Township, Vermilion County, Illinois, United States. It is part of the Danville, Illinois Metropolitan Statistical Area. The population is 3,300 in 2020.

It is named after Charles Tilton, a friend of Abraham Lincoln, who worked for the railroads. Lincoln reputedly had Thanksgiving dinner at Tilton's house in the village in the 1850s.

Geography

Demographics

As of the census of 2000, there were 2,976 people, 1,322 households, and 823 families residing in the village. The racial makeup of the village was 98.29% White, 0.17% African American, 0.10% Native American, 0.07% Asian, 0.34% from other races, and 1.04% from two or more races. Hispanic or Latino of any race were 1.08% of the population.

There were 1,322 households, out of which 23.8% had children under the age of 18 living with them, 47.4% were married couples living together, 11.3% had a female householder with no husband present, and 37.7% were non-families. 32.7% of all households were made up of individuals, and 14.2% had someone living alone who was 65 years of age or older. The average household size was 2.25 and the average family size was 2.83.

In the village, the population was spread out, with 22.0% under the age of 18, 8.1% from 18 to 24, 25.0% from 25 to 44, 26.9% from 45 to 64, and 18.0% who were 65 years of age or older. The median age was 41 years. For every 100 females, there were 88.2 males. For every 100 females age 18 and over, there were 86.8 males.

The median income for a household in the village was $31,810, and the median income for a family was $37,727. Males had a median income of $35,455 versus $20,988 for females. The per capita income for the village was $16,276. About 6.2% of families and 8.6% of the population were below the poverty line, including 6.7% of those under age 18 and 8.3% of those age 65 or over.

Notable people

 Bert Graham: infielder with the St Louis Browns
 Joseph Kirkland: journalist and novelist
 Russ Meers: pitcher for the Chicago Cubs

References

External links
 
 Census 2000 data for Tilton

Villages in Vermilion County, Illinois
Villages in Illinois